Irma Gerd is the stage name of Jason Wells, a Canadian drag performer who is best known for competing on the third season of Canada's Drag Race, where she placed sixth.

Early life
Wells is originally from Corner Brook.

Career
Gerd began performing in 2012. She is a founding member of the non-binary drag collective, the Phlegm Fatales. Gerd hosted Drag Race viewing parties at Valhalla Tavern in St. John's, as of 2018. She was featured on the third season of Canada's Drag Race.

On Canada's Drag Race she became the first queen from Atlantic Canada to compete on the show.

Personal life
Wells uses the pronouns they/them out of drag and she/her in drag.

Filmography

Television

Web series

References

1989 births
Living people
21st-century Canadian LGBT people
Canada's Drag Race contestants
Canadian drag queens
People from Corner Brook
People from St. John's, Newfoundland and Labrador